The 1977 IAAF World Race Walking Cup was held in Milton Keynes, United Kingdom, on 24–25 September 1977. For the first time, a new competition name IAAF Race Walking World Cup was introduced replacing the former Lugano Trophy. As in 1975, there was a women's 5 km race held as invitation event. Mexico was dominant in the men's events, taking the team title and the top two spots in the 20 km and 50 km events through Daniel Bautista, Domingo Colín, Raúl González and Pedro Aroche. Sweden's Siv Gustavsson  won the invitational women's event. 

Complete results were published.

Medallists

†: Invitation event.

Results

Men's 20 km

Men's 50 km

Team (men)
The team rankings, named Lugano Trophy, combined the 20km and 50km events team results.

Women's 5 km†

†: Invitation event.

Participation
The participation of 119 athletes (96 men/23 women) from  countries is reported.

 (-/1)
 (-/1)
 (8/-)
 (8/-)
 (8/-)
 (-/1)
 (8/-)
 (8/-)
 (8/-)
 (8/)
 (8/4)
 (8/-)
 (8/16)
 (8/-)
 (8/-)

Qualifying rounds
From 1961 to 1985 there were qualifying rounds for the men's competition with the first two winners proceeding to the final. This year, the Soviet Union, the German Democratic Republic, the Federal Republic of Germany, the United Kingdom, the United States, and México proceeded directly to the final.

Zone 1
San Remo, Italy, 27/28 August

Zone 2
Vänersborg, Sweden, 27 August

Zone 3
Lessines, Belgium, 27/28 August

References

World Athletics Race Walking Team Championships
World Race Walking Cup
International athletics competitions hosted by England
World Race Walking Cup
IAAF World Race Walking Cup